The 2006 season was the San Diego Chargers' 37th season in the National Football League, and the 47th overall.  They improved on their 9–7 record in 2005 and finished the campaign as the No. 1 seed in the AFC ending the season at 14–2, the best record in the NFL in 2006.  Their two regular season losses were by a combined 6 points. The team would experience a brutal home-field playoff loss for the second time in the past three seasons losing in the final minutes, this time to the New England Patriots 24–21. This was the first of four consecutive AFC West titles for the Chargers.

Running back LaDainian Tomlinson led the league in rushing with 1,815 yards, as well as setting NFL single-season records for rushing touchdowns (28) and total touchdowns (31). It was the final season the Chargers wore their powder blue-free uniforms.

Off-season
The Chargers did not re-sign All–Pro quarterback Drew Brees to a contract, Brees had suffered a torn  labrum in his throwing shoulder in the final game of the season, and turned instead to 2004 1st round selection Philip Rivers. Brees would later sign a contract with the New Orleans Saints as a free agent and make a complete recovery.

Chargers ownership announced in January that the team would no longer attempt to place a proposal for a new stadium on the November ballot as they were not able to locate private partners to facilitate financing of the project. The team had begun talks with city officials in 2002 stating that Qualcomm Stadium was inadequate to meet the financial needs of the franchise, and that they needed the city's help in building a new stadium to remain competitive.

2006 NFL Draft 
In the NFL Draft, the Chargers used their first pick on Florida State cornerback Antonio Cromartie. They used their second pick on Auburn offensive tackle Marcus McNeill. The remainder of their draft picks were Clemson quarterback Charlie Whitehurst, Iowa State linebacker Tim Dobbins, Kansas State offensive tackle Jeromey Clary, Virginia kicker Kurt Smith, North Carolina defensive end Chase Page, and Virginia Tech offensive tackle Jimmy Martin.

NFL Draft

Training camp 

Expectations varied for the Chargers' 2006 season. Questions centered on the play of the untested QB Rivers in his first season starting, and with the offensive line, especially at the crucial left tackle position. OLT Roman Oben injury in 2005 had a negative impact on all aspects of the offense and his replacement Lender Jordan ability to protect QB Rivers blindside was unproven. Jordan was injured in training camp and 2nd round draft pick OT Marcus McNeill landed the starting job and went on to have a Pro Bowl season.  Defensively, the front seven remained talented and solid.  LB depth was tested with Steve Foley's off-the-field injury; however, his replacement OLB Shaun Phillips (42 tackles, 23 assists, 11.5 sacks) came through with a major quality performance.  The unit returned numerous key players, including nose tackle Jamal Williams, DE Luis Castillo, DE Igor Olshansky  and 2005 Defensive Rookie of the Year Shawne Merriman, that made the Chargers the best team in the NFL against the run in 2005 season. Another area of concern was in the secondary,  Cromartie, who sat out his last season at Florida State with a knee injury, is talented but inexperience was not expected to contribute right away . Cromartie filled the 3rd CB role for the team and pressed starting CB Drayton Florence for playing time. Safety play became more of a concern particularly with the arrest of DB Terrence Kiel by federal law enforcement officials on drug charges during the regular season and the re-injury to DB Bhawoh Jue's knee.

Roster

Preseason

Regular season

Standings

Regular season

Week 1: at Oakland Raiders

at McAfee Coliseum, Oakland, California

The Chargers opened the season on September 11, 2006, with a 27–0 victory over the division rival Oakland Raiders. This second game of a Monday Night Football doubleheader marked the first time the Chargers had shut out the Raiders since a 44–0 win in 1961.

LaDainian Tomlinson led the Chargers with 31 carries for 131 yards, while Philip Rivers, in his debut as an NFL starting quarterback, completed 8 of 11 pass attempts for 108 yards with one touchdown pass and no interceptions. The Chargers' defense stifled the Raiders' running game, holding Raiders RB Lamont Jordan to 20 yards on 10 carries, and recorded 9 quarterback sacks against Raiders QBs Aaron Brooks and Andrew Walter. Three of those sacks belonged to second-year LB Shawne Merriman.

With the win, the Chargers extended their winning streak against Oakland to six games, while head coach Marty Schottenheimer improved his head coaching record against the Raiders to 26–7. Schottenheimer also earned his 187th career victory, passing Chuck Knox to become the seventh-winning-est head coach in NFL history.

That shutout also marked the second time ever that Oakland had been shut out in their own stadium, the second being the Denver Broncos and the third being the St. Louis Rams as the Chargers picked up their 6th straight win over the Raiders and started their season 1–0.

Week 2: vs. Tennessee Titans

at Qualcomm Stadium, San Diego

The Chargers hosted the Tennessee Titans in their Week 2 home-opener, winning 40–7. Tomlinson rushed for two touchdowns and tied Lance Alworth for the Chargers record for most career touchdowns with 83.  Vince Young spoiled the Chargers bid for a second straight shutout by throwing a touchdown pass late in the fourth quarter, though the 7 straight quarters of holding the opponent scoreless were the most to open a season since the 1977 Raiders.  With the win, the Chargers went into their bye week at 2–0.

Philip Rivers completed 25 passes out of 35 attempts, racking up 235 yards and a touchdown.

Week 4: at Baltimore Ravens

at M&T Bank Stadium, Baltimore, Maryland

Coming off of their Bye, the Chargers traveled to M&T Bank Stadium to take on the Baltimore Ravens.  The Chargers drew first blood as QB Philip Rivers completed a 31-yard TD pass to WR Malcom Floyd.  However, the Ravens would tie the game up with QB Steve McNair completing a 5-yard TD pass to TE Daniel Wilcox.  In the second quarter, kicker Nate Kaeding would give the Chargers some comfort, as he kicked a 34-yard and a 54-yard field goal (a then career long) to give San Diego the lead at halftime.

After a scoreless third quarter, the Ravens slowly started to climb back.  Late in the fourth quarter, after giving Baltimore an intentional safety (instead of punting deep from their own end zone), the Chargers hoped that their defense could hold up and prevent any chance of a comeback.  Unfortunately, McNair led the offense throughout the closing minutes and scored the game-winning touchdown with a 10-yard TD pass to TE Todd Heap.  With their loss, the Chargers fell to 2–1.

Week 5: vs. Pittsburgh Steelers

at Qualcomm Stadium, San Diego

Hoping to rebound from their last-second loss to the Ravens, the Chargers flew back home and donned their throwback uniforms for a Sunday Night match-up with the defending Super Bowl champions, the Pittsburgh Steelers.  The Chargers struggled early as their offense actually had −2 total yards, while the defense gave up a 9-yard TD run by RB Willie Parker in the first quarter.  In the second quarter, the Chargers continued to trail, as Steelers kicker Jeff Reed completed a 39-yard field goal.  San Diego would start to get back into the game, as QB Philip Rivers completed a 9-yard TD pass to WR Malcom Floyd.  In the third quarter, the Chargers charged right into the lead, as kicker Nate Kaeding kicked a 28-yard field goal, while Rivers hooked up with TE Antonio Gates for a 22-yard TD strike.  In the fourth quarter, Kaeding put the game away with a 33-yard and a 22-yard field goal, while the defense squashed any hope of a Steeler comeback as the Chargers improved to 3–1.

Week 6: at San Francisco 49ers

at Candlestick Park, San Francisco

Riding high from their win over Pittsburgh, the Chargers traveled up north to Candlestick Park for a Week 6 fight with their other state rival, the San Francisco 49ers.  In the first quarter, San Diego struck first as QB Philip Rivers completed a 57-yard TD pass to TE Antonio Gates, yet the Niners tied the game with QB Alex Smith completing a 15-yard TD pass to WR Bryan Gilmore. RB LaDainian Tomlinson helped the Chargers retake the lead, as he got a 5-yard TD run.  In a topsy-turvy second quarter, points were flying everywhere.  It began with 49ers kicker Joe Nedney kicking a 42-yard field goal.  Afterwards, the Chargers retook the lead as Rivers hooked up with WR Vincent Jackson on a 33-yard TD strike, followed by Tomlinson getting a 1-yard TD run.  Then, Smith connected with FB Moran Norris on a 2-yard pass for San Francisco, which was followed up with the Niners getting a safety from an intentional grounding penalty. Tomlinson would get another 1-yard TD run to end the quarter.  In the second half, San Diego scored 13 unanswered points to seal the game, with kicker Nate Kaeding kicking two field goals (24-yarder in the third quarter and a 44-yarder in the fourth quarter) and Tomlinson iced the game with one more 5-yard touchdown run.  With their victory, the Chargers improved to 4–1

Week 7: at Kansas City Chiefs

at Arrowhead Stadium, Kansas City, Missouri

The Chargers flew to Arrowhead Stadium for a Week 7 fight with their AFC West rival, the Kansas City Chiefs.  In the first quarter, San Diego fell behind early with KC QB Damon Huard completing an 11-yard TD pass to TE Kris Wilson and a 21-yard TD pass to WR Eddie Kennison.  In the second quarter, the Chargers got on the board with kicker Nate Kaeding making a 39-yard field goal, yet Kansas City would respond with an 11-yard run by RB Larry Johnson.  Kaeding made a 31-yard field goal for San Diego to end the half.  In the third quarter, both teams swapped touchdowns, as QB Philip Rivers threw a 1-yard TD pass to TE Antonio Gates, while Johnson got a 1-yard TD run.  In the fourth quarter, RB LaDainian Tomlinson caught a 37-yard TD pass and then threw a 1-yard TD pass to TE Brandon Manumaleuna. Kansas City  Chiefs kicker Lawrence Tynes was good on a 53-yard field goal to seal the win for Kansas City, dropping San Diego to 4–2.

Week 8: vs. St. Louis Rams

at Qualcomm Stadium, San Diego

The Chargers returned home for a Week 8 fight with the St. Louis Rams.  In the first quarter, RB LaDainian Tomlinson completed a 2-yard TD run and a 38-yard TD run.  In the second quarter, the Rams climbed into the contest with RB Steven Jackson completing a 3-yard TD run for the Rams' only score of the period.  In the third quarter, San Diego gained some distance in their lead, as free safety Marlon McCree returned a fumble 79 yards for a touchdown.  St. Louis got a field goal, as kicker Jeff Wilkins hit from 34 yards out.  The Chargers also got a field goal, as kicker Nate Kaeding was good from 31 yards out. In the fourth quarter, San Diego RB Michael Turner scored on a 14-yard TD run, while Rams QB Marc Bulger completed a 7-yard TD pass to WR Shaun McDonald. The Chargers responded with QB Philip Rivers completing a 25-yard TD pass to Tomlinson, while Bulger completed a 6-yard TD pass to WR Kevin Curtis, in favor of St. Louis.  In the end, the Chargers improved to 5–2.

Week 9: vs. Cleveland Browns

at Qualcomm Stadium, San Diego

The Chargers at home, donned their throwback jerseys and played a Week 9 fight against the Cleveland Browns.  In the first quarter, both sides would limit each other to a field goal.  Chargers kicker Nate Kaeding would complete a 29-yard field goal, while Browns kicker Phil Dawson completed a 37-yard field goal.  In the second quarter, Dawson would help Cleveland take the lead on a 20-yard field goal.  San Diego a defensive touchdown as back as LB Marques Harris recovered a fumble in the Browns end zone.  The Brown's would retake the lead with Dawson nailing a 42-yard and a 30-yard field goal.  In the third quarter, the Chargers RB LaDainian Tomlinson got a 41-yard TD run for the only score of the period. In the fourth quarter, Dawson helped the Browns by converting a 36-yard field goal,  San Diego continued to add to their total with Tomlinson getting a 7-yard TD run.  Dawson would get one more field goal (from 35 yards out), the Chargers continued to score touchdowns as Tomlinson ran one in from 8-yard out. QB Philip Rivers completed a 2-point conversion pass to WR Vincent Jackson.  Afterwards, Cleveland would get its only touchdown of the game, as QB Charlie Frye hooked up with WR Braylon Edwards on a 4-yard pass. In the end, San Diego came out on top and improved to 6–2.

Week 10: at Cincinnati Bengals

at Paul Brown Stadium, Cincinnati, Ohio

In a high scoring contest the San Diego Chargers overcame two 21-point deficits to take down the Cincinnati Bengals on the road. The game started off with Carson Palmer completing 7 of his first 10 passes and with two short runs by Jeremi Johnson and Rudi Johnson plus a long pass to Chad Johnson of 51 yards the Bengals were dominating the Chargers going up 21–0 after the first quarter. The Chargers were able to get things working a little bit in the second quarter with LaDainian Tomlinson running a TD in from 9-yds out to shrink the deficit to 21–7, but a 7-yd pass to Chris Henry finished the first half with the Bengals up 28–7. The Chargers came out for the third quarter and rebounded with a 4-yd run by LT and a 46-yd pass from Philip Rivers to WR Malcom Floyd to make it a 28–21 game. Cincinnati responded by driving down field again; however, this time they had to settle for a field goal to make the score 31–21. Philip Rivers lead the Chargers down field with a 9-play 80-yd drive capped off with a 9-yd strike to TE Brandon Manumaleuna to get within 3 making it 31–28. But the Chargers defense lapsed again with no one covering Johnson when Palmer passed him the ball for a 74-yd reception to make it 38–28. The Chargers drove down field again and ended the third quarter in position to shrink the lead allowing the team to start off the final quarter of play with a 2-yd run to make the score 38–35. Then after the kickoff Chargers Linebacker Shaun Phillips sacked Carson Palmer on first down forcing a fumble that was recovered by the Chargers. A 9-yd run by LaDainian Tomlinson gave the Chargers their first lead by the score of 42–38. The Bengals came within one with a 44-yd kick making it 42–41, but the Bolts were not to be denied as Rivers led yet another drive down field ending with a  shovel pass to Manumaleuna who wasn't covered to make the score 49–41 and the Chargers officially tied their biggest comeback in team history with LaDainian Tomlinson getting 108-yds rushing and 4 rushing TDs and Philip Rivers passing for 24 of 36 and 337 yds with three touchdowns.

With the win, the Chargers improved to 7–2.

Week 11: at Denver Broncos

at Invesco Field at Mile High, Denver, Colorado

LaDainian Tomlinson made history by becoming the fastest running back to reach 100 career TDs by doing it in 89 games, eclipsing the mark set by Emmitt Smith and Jim Brown of 93 games. He also continued his march toward beating Shaun Alexander's single-season TD record by scoring 4 TDs to bring his total to 22, just 5 short of tying Alexander's mark. Philip Rivers had a good day as well, throwing 19 of 26 for 222 yards and two TDs, although he did throw two picks including a 31-yard interception return for a TD by Denver cornerback Darrent Williams. The game started out with Tomlinson running it in from 3 yards out to make it 7–0 San Diego. Denver's Mike Bell ran for two TDs in during the 2nd quarter to make it a 14–7 Denver lead at halftime. After the break, Denver continued the scoring with a Jason Elam's 42-yd field goal and Williams INT return to make it a 24–7 lead for Denver. But just like last week against the Bengals, the Chargers wouldn't say die putting together two scoring drives including a 3-yard run by LT, his 100th TD, and a 51-yd pass to LT by Rivers to cut the lead to 24–21 at the end of the third quarter. Elam helped the Broncos' cause by hitting a 38-yd kick to extend the Broncos' lead to 27–21, but that only lasted until Rivers found Vincent Jackson open at the back of the end zone to put the Chargers up 28–27. On the ensuing Broncos drive, Drayton Florence then intercepted Jake Plummer's 4th and 4 pass to give the Bolts terrific field position that set up a 1-yard run by LT to make it 35–27; it was his 4th TD of the night and 102nd of his career. That left Denver 1:14 to try to tie the game. They started that drive from their 3 and made it all the way to the Chargers 32 in part to a personal foul on Chargers defensive end Igor Olshansky, who was ejected for punching Broncos center Tom Nalen. The Broncos' hopes for overtime ended when Plummer was sacked by Shaun Phillips and time ran out, giving San Diego their first win in Denver in 7 years as well as sole position of first place in the AFC West and improved their record to 8–2.

Week 12: vs. Oakland Raiders

at Qualcomm Stadium, San Diego

LaDainian Tomlinson ran in two TDs and threw for one to give San Diego its third straight comeback win. He then had 21 rushing touchdowns on the year and brought his career QB record to 7 completions out of 10 attempts with 6 touchdowns. Philip Rivers, on the other hand, struggled completing 14 of 31 passes and throwing for only a 133 yards with no touchdowns and 1 interception. The Chargers swept the Raiders and had then won seven straight from Oakland. The scoring started with the Raiders  making it 7–0 after a 1-yard pass from Aaron Brooks to Reshard Lee. The Chargers answered back when Antonio Cromartie returned the ensuing kick 91 yards, which set up a 2-yard run by LT to tie the score at 7–7 going into the half. The Raiders took the lead again on a catch and run by rookie John Madsen that set up a 2-yard pass from Brooks to Madsen to make it 14–7 Oakland.  On 4th and 2, Rivers passed to Vincent Jackson for a first down, but Jackson proceeded to get up and throw the ball forward in celebration, but he hadn't been touched down. The initial ruling was that it was a fumble and Oakland's ball; however, after the officials got together for a conference they declared that since it was an illegal forward fumble that it was technically an illegal forward pass and San Diego was then given back the ball and penalized 5 yards, which was still enough for the first down. The game continued and on the next play, Rivers pitched the ball to Tomlinson as if it were a run play but then threw the ball to an open Antonio Gates to tie the score at 14–14. After forcing Oakland to punt, the Chargers drove down field and LT ran it in from 10 yards out to give the Chargers the 21–14 win.

With the win, the Chargers had won 7 straight games over the Raiders and improved their record to 9–2.

Week 13: at Buffalo Bills

at Ralph Wilson Stadium, Buffalo, New York

Coming off a season-sweep over the Raiders, the Chargers flew to Ralph Wilson Stadium for a cold Week 13 fight against the throwback-clad Buffalo Bills.  This game would also mark the return of San Diego's star linebacker Shawne Merriman after his four-game suspension for failing a test for performance-enhancing drugs.  In the first quarter, the Chargers drew first blood with kicker Nate Kaeding's 42-yard field goal and RB LaDainian Tomlinson's 51-yard TD run.  In the second quarter, San Diego got the only score of the period with QB Philip Rivers completing an 11-yard TD pass to TE Antonio Gates.  In the third quarter, the Bills started to come back with QB J. P. Losman completing a 5-yard TD pass to TE Robert Royal, while RB Willis McGahee got a 2-yard TD run.  In the fourth quarter, the Chargers distanced themselves from Buffalo with Tomlinson's 2-yard TD run.  The Bills would get another touchdown, with Losman completing a 6-yard pass to WR Peerless Price. San Diego would emerge as the victor.  With their sixth-straight win, the Chargers improved to 10–2.

Week 14: vs. Denver Broncos

at Qualcomm Stadium, San Diego
|TV=CBS |TVAnnouncers= Jim Nantz and Phil Simms

The game featured newly appointed rookie Denver QB Jay Cutler. In a stark contrast to the come-from-behind victory against Denver earlier in the season, San Diego scored early and often in this game, leading the game 28–3 at halftime. It was all Denver in the 3rd quarter, the Broncos closing the gap to 28–20, but San Diego bounced back in the fourth quarter with 20 unanswered points, winning the game 48–20. The win, as well as a Kansas City Chiefs loss earlier in the day, clinched the AFC West Division for San Diego. With the Indianapolis Colts also losing earlier in the day, San Diego gained the best record in the AFC (11–2). In addition, with his 7-yard rushing touchdown toward the end of the 4th quarter (his third of the game), RB LaDainian Tomlinson broke the NFL single-season touchdown record (29) (26 Rushing, 3 receiving), set by the Seattle Seahawks' RB Shaun Alexander (28) in the previous season.

Week 15: vs. Kansas City Chiefs

at Qualcomm Stadium, San Diego

After a 3-point loss earlier in the year, the Chargers were set to split the season series with the Kansas City Chiefs. Kansas City meanwhile was reeling from a loss against Baltimore, and the death of the team's owner, Lamar Hunt. In this game the Chargers were again led to victory by LaDainian Tomlinson who scored twice, breaking the NFL single-season scoring record held by Paul Hornung for the last 46 years. The latter was an 85-yard touchdown rush which is the longest of his career. He also broke Shaun Alexander and Priest Holmes's shared Single Season Rushing TD record by getting 28 rushing touchdowns and added to the record he set last week for total touchdowns with 31 (28 rushing, 3 receiving). Moreover, he set the record for most consecutive Multi-Touchdown Games with 8.

With the win, the Chargers improved to 12–2.

Week 16: at Seattle Seahawks

at Qwest Field, Seattle

San Diego took the lead late in the second quarter when Philip Rivers threw a TD to WR Vincent Jackson, giving San Diego a 7–0 lead going into halftime. Rivers had a bad first half completing only 1 of 10 passes, the only completion being a touchdown. The 3rd quarter saw San Diego add to their lead making it 10–0. But Seattle RB Shaun Alexander narrowed the gap with a rushing TD making it 10–7, San Diego would answer back with a field goal to make it 13–7, but on Seattle's ensuing drive they allowed another Alexander TD to make the score 14–13 and they would allow a field goal to give Seattle a 17–13 lead. With time running out San Diego drove down the field and Rivers would connect with a 37-yd pass to Jackson to give the Chargers a 20–17 lead with only :29 seconds remaining. The defense would hold and the Chargers continued their winning ways setting a team record 13th win. The win also clinched a first round bye and set up the Chargers to control their own destiny the next week against Arizona, as a win would clinch them homefield advantage throughout the playoffs.

With the win, the Chargers improved to 13–2.

Week 17: vs. Arizona Cardinals

at Qualcomm Stadium, San Diego

With the San Diego Chargers on their way to owning the AFC's top seed in the playoffs, Rivers threw two touchdown passes after injuring his right foot, and LaDainian Tomlinson also limped off after wrapping up his first NFL rushing title in leading the Chargers to a 27–20 win over the Arizona Cardinals on Sunday.  The Chargers clinched home-field advantage throughout the AFC playoffs. They'd already earned a first-round bye, which gave Rivers and Tomlinson time to heal. Their exact injuries weren't disclosed. Tomlinson ran for 66 yards, giving him 1,815 and the league rushing title. He beat Larry Johnson of the division rival Kansas City Chiefs, who had 1,789. Tomlinson did not score for the second straight game, but he already was the league's most prolific scorer in a single season, with 31 touchdowns and 186 points.

With the win, the Chargers finished the season at 14–2.

Playoffs

The Chargers had a first-round bye as a result of being the number one seed in the AFC.

AFC Divisional Playoffs: vs. New England Patriots 

at Qualcomm Stadium, San Diego
Game time: 4:30 pm EST/1:30 pm PST
Game weather: 53 °F (Sunny)
TV announcers (CBS): Jim Nantz (play-by-play) and Phil Simms (color commentator)
Referee: Tony Corrente
Game Attendance: 68,810

In the divisional playoffs, the New England Patriots faced a San Diego Chargers team who were unbeaten at home in the regular season. The Chargers boasted a roster that included nine Pro Bowlers, five All-Pro players, and league MVP running back LaDainian Tomlinson, who had shattered several league records. However, four turnovers, three of which were converted into Patriots scoring drives, eventually led to the demise of the Chargers. San Diego ended up losing despite outgaining the Patriots in rushing yards, 148–51 and total yards, 352–327, while also intercepting three passes from Tom Brady.

In the first quarter, after San Diego coach Marty Schottenheimer opted to go for it on 4th-and-11 instead of attempting a 47-yard field goal, quarterback Philip Rivers lost a fumble while being sacked by Mike Vrabel, setting up Stephen Gostkowski's 51-yard field goal with 40 seconds left in the period. In the second quarter, Chargers receiver Eric Parker's 13-yard punt return set up a 48-yard scoring drive that ended with LaDainian Tomlinson's 2-yard touchdown run, giving his team a 7–3 lead. Then, on the Patriots' next drive, linebacker Donnie Edwards intercepted a pass from Brady and returned it to the 41-yard line. But the Chargers ended up punting after Rivers was sacked on third down by defensive back Artrell Hawkins. Later in the quarter, Tomlinson rushed twice for 13 yards and took a screen pass 58 yards to the Patriots' 6-yard line, setting up a 6-yard touchdown run by Michael Turner with 2:04 left in the half. New England responded with a 72-yard scoring drive, with receiver Jabar Gaffney catching four passes for 46 yards, including a 7-yard touchdown reception with six seconds left in the half, cutting their deficit to 14–10.

In the third quarter, Brady threw his second interception of the game.  But once again, the Chargers were forced to punt after Rivers was sacked on third down. Mike Scifres' 36-yard punt pinned New England back at their own 2-yard line, and San Diego subsequently forced a punt, but Parker muffed the kick and New England's David Thomas recovered the fumble at the Chargers' 31-yard line. New England's drive seemed to stall after Brady fumbled on 3rd and 13. Patriots' tackle Matt Light recovered it and Chargers defensive back Drayton Florence drew a 15-yard unsportsmanlike conduct penalty for a personal foul. The drive continued and Gostkowski eventually kicked a 34-yard field goal to cut their deficit to 14–13. Then, on San Diego's next drive, linebacker Rosevelt Colvin made an interception of a Rivers pass at the New England 36-yard line. The Patriots then drove to the Chargers 41-yard line, but were halted there and had to punt. After the punt, Rivers completed two passes to tight end Antonio Gates for 31 yards and a 31-yard pass to Vincent Jackson, setting up Tomlinson's second rushing touchdown to give the Chargers an 8-point lead, 21–13.

New England responded by driving to San Diego's 41-yard line. On a fourth-down conversion attempt, Brady's pass was intercepted by Marlon McCree, but Troy Brown stripped the ball, and receiver Reche Caldwell recovered it. Schottenheimer then called a timeout challenging the officials call of interception and fumble by McCree. The Chargers forfeited the time out when the official ruling of the play was upheld. Four plays later, Brady threw a 4-yard touchdown pass to Caldwell. On the next play, running back Kevin Faulk took a direct snap and scored the two-point conversion, tying the game. Then, after forcing a punt, Brady completed a 19-yard pass to Daniel Graham. Two plays later, Caldwell caught a 49-yard pass down the right sideline to set up Gostkowski's third field goal (a 31 yarder) to give them a 24–21 lead with only 1:10 left in the fourth quarter. With no timeouts left, San Diego drove to the Patriots 36-yard line on their final possession, but Nate Kaeding's 54-yard field goal attempt fell short with three seconds remaining in the game.

After the game, the Patriots erupted in a controversial celebration, mocking the "Lights Out" dance of LB Shawne Merriman and stomping on the Chargers mid-field logo which made Chargers' quarterback Philip Rivers and running back LaDainian Tomlinson confront Patriots players. The controversy was a response to remarks made by Schottenheimer after the Chargers snapped the Patriots 21-game home winning streak in 2005 where he noted "I'll have to be honest. During the course of the week, I wondered, 'Is there a breaking point, where all of a sudden you can't find enough fingers to plug the dike?'," referencing the injuries the Patriots faced early in the 2005 season.

Gaffney finished with ten catches for 103 yards and a touchdown. Tomlinson rushed for 123 yards, caught two passes for 64 yards, and scored two touchdowns.

With the brutal loss, it ended the Chargers' season with an overall record of 14–3.

Scoring
First quarter
NE – Stephen Gostkowski 50 yd FG, :40. Patriots 3–0. Drive: 9 plays, 33 yards, 4:35.
Second quarter
SD – LaDainian Tomlinson 2 yd TD run (Kaeding kick), 7:19. Chargers 7–3. Drive: 9 plays, 48 yards, 4:31.
SD – Michael Turner 6 yd TD run (Kaeding kick), 2:04. Chargers 14–3. Drive: 4 plays, 77 yards, 2:23.
NE – Jabar Gaffney 6 yd TD pass from Tom Brady (Gostkowski kick), :08. Chargers 14–10. Drive: 11 plays, 72 yards, 1:56.
Third quarter
NE – Stephen Gostkowski 34 yd FG, 2:11. Chargers 14–13. Drive: 7 plays, 15 yards, 3:09.
Fourth quarter
SD – LaDainian Tomlinson 3 yd TD run (Kaeding kick), 8:35. Chargers 21–13. Drive: 9 plays, 83 yards, 4:44.
NE – Reche Caldwell 4 yd TD pass from Tom Brady (Kevin Faulk 2 pt conversion run), 4:36. Tied 21–21. Drive: 5 plays, 32 yards, 1:40.
NE – Stephen Gostkowski 31 yd FG, 1:10. Patriots 24–21. Drive: 8 plays, 72 yards, 2:16.

Pro Bowl
The San Diego Chargers had more Pro Bowlers for the 2006 season than any other team, with a total of 11. This included QB Philip Rivers (who did not play due to a foot injury), RB LaDainian Tomlinson, K Nate Kaeding, OLB Shawne Merriman, T Jamal Williams, OC Nick Hardwick, FB Lorenzo Neal, ST Kassim Osgood, TE Antonio Gates, LT Marcus McNeil, and LS David Binn.

Awards and records
 LaDainian Tomlinson, Bert Bell Award
LaDainian Tomlinson, NFL MVP
LaDainian Tomlinson, Walter Payton NFL Man of the Year
LaDainian Tomlinson, NFL Offensive Player of the Year

References

San Diego Chargers
San Diego Chargers seasons
AFC West championship seasons
San Diego